In wood, figure refers to the appearance of wood, as seen on a longitudinal surface (side-grain): a "figured wood" is not plain.

The figure of a particular piece of wood is, in part, due to its grain and, in part, due to the cut, or to innate properties of the wood. A few of the tropical hardwoods, like the rosewoods, may have a unique figure.
 
Types of figure include: angel step, "bear scratches," bird's eye, blister, burl, curl, ribbon curl, dimple, fiddleback, flame, wide flame, "ghost", pin stripe, quilted, spalted and tiger stripe.

Wood